Ali Osat Hashemi is an Iranian reformist politician. He was born 1958 in Sonqor County, Kermanshah Province, Iran. He was the Deputy Minister of Iran's Ministry of Cooperatives, Labour, and Social Welfare and the head of the Iran Technical and Vocational Training Organization, from 2019 to 2021.

Former Deputy Minister of Iran's Ministry of Agriculture Jihad and former CEO of the Central Organization for Rural Cooperatives of Iran in the Government of Hassan Rouhani (2017–2021) and former Governor-general of Sistan and Baluchestan Province in the Government of Hassan Rouhani (2013–17) are among the his previous responsibilities mentioned.

Life and career
Ali Osat Hashemi was born in Sonqor County, Kermanshah Province, Iran around 1958, but his identity booklet states February 5, 1960, as birth date, which according to him the date is not valid. He grew up in a family with seven siblings and continued his education until his master's degree.

In 1979, during the Iranian Revolution, he was actively involved in this incident and became a veteran in these conflicts. After the victory of the Revolution, he joined the Islamic Revolutionary Guard Corps (IRGC) and served 14 months there, then served in service institutions such as the Imam Khomeini Relief Foundation and the Iranian Red Crescent Society. In 1982, he entered the Iran's Ministry of Interior and served in Governorate section. He also served as political deputy in three provinces of Iran, general political director in two provinces, general director of two provincial branch of National Organization for Civil Registration of Iran, political and security deputy in three provinces, Governor-general of Tehran and head of the Mostazafan Foundation.

He married in 1983 and has three sons.

His officials

He has served in various positions for the Iran government. Including:

 Head of the Iran Technical and Vocational Training Organization
 CEO of the Central Organization for Rural Cooperatives of Iran
 Governor-general of Sistan and Baluchestan Province
 Political and Security Deputy of Kurdistan Governorate
 Governor-general of Tehran
 Political and Security Deputy of Qazvin Governorate
 Governor-general of Gilan-e Gharb
 General Director of Political and Law Enforcement of Kermanshah Governorate
 General Director of Political and Law Enforcement of Chaharmahal and Bakhtiari Province Governorate
 Central prefect of Kangavar County
 Mayor of Kangavar County
 Director General of Civil Registry of Kurdistan Province
 Director General of Civil Registry of Yazd Province
 Head of Jihad of Construction of Sonqor County
 Chairman of the Coordinating Council for Combating Drug Trafficking in Tehran, Qazvin and Kurdistan Provinces
 Chairman of the Coordination Council for Combating Commodity and Currency Smuggling in Tehran, Kurdistan and Qazvin Provinces
 Head of various working groups and commissions (health, education, tourism, culture and art, physical education, labor, security and law enforcement) in the provinces of Tehran, Qazvin, Kurdistan, Chaharmahal and Bakhtiari and Kermanshah
 chairman of the board of Inquiry into the Violations of the Employees of the Governorates of Tehran, Qazvin, Kurdistan, Chaharmahal and Bakhtiari
 managing director of Eram Cultural and Artistic Association of Mostazafan Foundation
 Head of election campaign in Tehran, Qazvin and Kurdistan provinces

Achievements
 The first prize of the twelfth National Environmental Award of Iran
 Achieving the first rank of Tehran Education Council
 Achieving the first rank in the fight against drugs in the provinces of Kurdistan and Tehran

Plans
 Preparing a plan for organizing and aggregating rural and border areas of Iran
 Preparation of weapons and ammunition identification plan in Kermanshah, Kurdistan and Chaharmahal and Bakhtiari provinces

See also
 Asadollah Alam
 Seyed Mahmood Hosseini
 Ahmad Mazani
 Shahrbanoo Amani
 Gholamreza Shariati
 Mohsen Safaei Farahani
 Mohammad Hossein Sharifzadegan
 Alireza Feyz

References

External links
 Ali Osat Hashemi on TheIranProject
 Iran marks World Oceans Day 2016
 Berlin-Tehran all-out ties to expand: German diplomat
 Sistan-Baluchestan to turn into tourist hub

1958 births
Living people
Iranian reformists
People from Sonqor
Governors of Sistan and Baluchestan Province